The Brébeuf Lake is a body of water tributary of the Saint-Jean River. It is in the municipality of Rivière-Éternité, Quebec, Canada.

The Brébeuf Lake is integrated into the zec du Lac-au-Sable, a controlled exploitation zone.

The southwest part of Brébeuf Lake is served by a forest road from the village of Saint-Félix-d'Otis where it connects to route 170. Few other secondary forest roads serve the lake sector for forestry and recreational tourism activities.

Forestry is the main economic activity in the sector; recreational tourism, second.

The surface of Brébeuf Lake is usually frozen from the end of November to the beginning of April, however safe circulation on the ice is generally made from mid-December to the end of March.

Geography 
The main watersheds near Brébeuf Lake are:
 north side: Bailoquet Lake, Éternity Lake, Otis Lake, Lac à la Croix, Saguenay River;
 east side: Périgny Lake, Saint-Jean river, Petit Saguenay River, Saguenay River;
 south side: rivière à la Catin, Cami River, Lac des Canots, Pierre River, Vipère lake, Cinto lake, rivière à Mars North-West;
 west side: Pierre River, Bras de Ross, Ha! Ha! River.

This lake includes a peninsula attached to the south shore forming a strait of a hundred meters along the north shore of the lake; this peninsula forms on the east side of "Anse à Taschereau". Brébeuf Lake is mainly fed by the Pierre River, Bras de Ross, the Papinachois stream and the outlet of Rond Lake. The main bays around the lake are: "Anse à Bacalem", "Anse à la Balle" and "Anse à Taschereau". While the northeast shore has several peaks exceeding 450 meters.

The mouth of the lake is in a small bay on the east side of the lake, either:
 south of Éternity Lake;
  south-east of the village center of Saint-Félix-d'Otis;
  south-east of a bay on the Saguenay River;
  north-east of Lake Ha! Ha!;
  south-east of the confluence of the Saint-Jean River and the Saguenay River;
  south-east of downtown Saguenay;
  south-west of Tadoussac town center.

Toponymy 
Born in Condé-sur-Vire, in France, the Jesuit father Jean de Brébeuf (1593-1649) came to New France, in 1625. He was a missionary at the Innu, near Quebec City, then in Huronia where he founded a mission. He was there with Father Gabriel Lalemant when, on March 16, the Iroquois carried out a deadly attack on the Wendat (Huron) establishments. Fathers Brébeuf and Lalemant are then brought back to mission St. Ignace Mission (region of Midland (Ontario)) where they die after being tortured. Pope Pius XI canonized him on June 20, 1930, along with six other Jesuits who were victims of the same fate, between 1642 and 1649.

The toponym "Lac Brébeuf" was formalized on December 5, 1968, by the Commission de toponymie du Québec.

See also 

 Le Fjord-du-Saguenay Regional County Municipality
 Ferland-et-Boilleau, a municipality
 Rivière-Éternité, a municipality
 Zec du Lac-au-Sable, a controlled exploitation zone (zec)
 Saint-Jean River
 Saguenay River

Notes and references 

Lakes of Saguenay–Lac-Saint-Jean
Le Fjord-du-Saguenay Regional County Municipality